"Shake dat Shit" (often censored as Shake Dat S***) is the debut single by American rapper Shawnna featuring fellow American rapper Ludacris from the former's debut solo studio album Worth tha Weight. It was released on March 16, 2004 via Disturbing tha Peace/Def Jam Recordings. Produced by Timbaland, the song peaked at number 63 on the Billboard Hot 100.

Track listing

Charts

Release history

References

External links

2004 songs
Shawnna songs
2004 debut singles
Songs written by Ludacris
Songs written by Timbaland
Def Jam Recordings singles
Song recordings produced by Timbaland

Ludacris songs